Ronald Hinton (born September 17, 1972) is an American serial killer who, between 1996 and 1999, raped and strangled to death three women in the Rogers Park neighborhood of Chicago in Illinois. In two of the cases, Hinton worked with accomplices. He pleaded guilty to each murder in 2004 to avoid a death sentence and was subsequently handed down three life terms.

Early life 
Ronald Hinton was born on September 17, 1972. A native of Chicago, he was raised in a dysfunctional household; his mother often stood on, and beat young Ronald and his siblings with a belt constantly, due to believing they had been tainted by Satan. Eventually, his mother abandoned the entire family. Growing up Hinton struggled with severe drug addiction, which only got worse as an adult with the death of his son. He eventually fathered one daughter before he began his killings. Before the murders, he led an extensive criminal life with numerous convictions for robbery.

Murders

Felicia Mullins 
On December 6, 1996, Hinton gained entry, either forcefully or was let into the apartment of 17-year-old Felicia Mullins, a girl whom he had a sexual relationship with, in Rogers Park. He attacked Mullins, assaulted, and strangled her to death. He left the apartment not long after, and Mullins' boyfriend who declined to have his identity revealed subsequently found the body hours later. He later flagged down a police cruiser and told officers that he had discovered the dead body of Mullins. Police subsequently saw the body for themselves, and a coroner stated that Mullins, who was also a mother of three and had produced her first child at 14, had been murdered via strangulation.

Keary Gagnier 
On August 18, 1998, Hinton and a man named Michael Sanders invaded the third-floor apartment of 36-year-old Keary Lea Gagnier in Rogers Park. Unlike Mullins, neither Hinton nor Sanders had previous relations with the victim. They attacked her in her bedroom, partially stripped her, raped, and following that Hinton strangled her to death. The duo then took belongings from her apartment, including her ID, and disposed of them in a trash can just outside of the building. Her body was found later on, and city sanitation workers later found her items in the can Hinton threw them in.

Merceda Ares 
On February 13, 1999, Hinton, Sanders, and a man named David Wales broke into the apartment of 31-year-old Merceda Faye Ares. The trio then raped and Hinton strangled Ares to death. They then took Ares' belongings, including her bank card and used it to withdraw money from an ATM.

Arrest 
Since the trio had used Ares's bankcard, they were spotted on a surveillance camera, and the images the camera captured were broadcast on local TV stations as evidence. Hinton's 3rd grade daughter saw the images and recognized her father's face. She subsequently came forward with the information to her teacher, who reported it to police. Eventually, Hinton, Sanders, and Wales were arrested. DNA evidence left at the crime scene confirmed their guilt in the murder of Ares. It also exposed Hinton and Sanders's involvement in the murder of Gagnier and exposed Hinton in the murder of Mullins. Subsequently, he was charged with all three, Sanders was charged with the two, and Wales was charged in one.

Plea and conviction 
In 2003, Wales was convicted for his role in Ares' murder and handed down a 40-year sentence and will be released in 2042 provided he maintains good behavior. Hinton, since he was accused of being the mastermind and the one whose name was being headlined as a serial killer, decided to take a plea deal which allowed him to plead guilty to all counts in order to avoid the death penalty and instead receive multiple life sentences. The judge in the case, James Schreier, agreed to the deal and dropped the death penalty. Schreier had previously dropped the death penalty for another serial killer, Ronald Macon, who also strangled three women in Chicago, though all of his killings occurred in Englewood. Hinton was subsequently given three life sentences without parole. Months later, Sanders was given two life sentences for his involvement.

As of today, Hinton is incarcerated at Hill Correctional Center, while Sanders and Wales a both serving their sentences at Stateville Correctional Center.

See also 
 List of serial killers in the United States

External links 
 Illinois Department of Corrections Information

References 

1972 births
1996 murders in the United States
1998 murders in the United States
1999 murders in the United States
20th-century American criminals
American male criminals
American people convicted of murder
American people convicted of robbery
American prisoners sentenced to life imprisonment
American rapists
American serial killers
Crime in Chicago
Criminals from Chicago
Living people
Male serial killers
People convicted of murder by Illinois
Prisoners sentenced to life imprisonment by Illinois
Violence against women in the United States